The bow is the forward part of the hull of a ship or boat, the point that is usually most forward when the vessel is underway. The aft end of the boat is the stern.

Prow may be used as a synonym for bow or it may mean the forward-most part of the bow above the waterline.

Function 

A ship's bow should be designed to enable the hull to pass efficiently through the water. Bow shapes vary according to the speed of the boat, the seas or waterways being navigated, and the vessel's function. Where sea conditions are likely to promote pitching, it is useful if the bow provides reserve buoyancy; a flared bow (a raked stem with flared topsides) is ideal to reduce the amount of water shipped over the bow.

Ideally, the bow should reduce the resistance and should be tall enough to prevent water from regularly washing over the top of it. Large commercial barges on inland waterways rarely meet big waves and may have remarkably little freeboard at the bow, whereas fast military vessels operating offshore must be able to cope with heavy seas. On slower ships like tankers and barges, a fuller bow shape is used to maximise the volume of the ship for a given length. The bow may be reinforced to serve as an ice-breaker.

The forward part of the bow is called the "stem" or "forestem". Traditionally, the stem was a timber (or metal) post into which side planks (or plates) were joined. Some boats such as the Dutch barge "aak" or the clinker-built Viking longships have no straight stem, having instead a curved prow.

Types 

Many types of bows exist. These include:

Etymology
From Middle Dutch boech or Old Norse bógr (shoulder). Thus it has the same origin as the English "bough" (from the Old English bóg, or bóh, (shoulder, the bough of a tree) but the nautical term is unrelated, being unknown in this sense in English before 1600.

Prow
The "prow" (French : proue) is the forward-most part of a ship's bow above the waterline. The terms prow and "bow" are often used interchangeably to describe the most forward part of a ship and its surrounding parts.

See also 

Boat building
Bow (rowing)
Deck
Figurehead
Glossary of nautical terms
Naval architecture
Port
Prow
Shipbuilding
Starboard
Stem (ship)
Superstructure

References

Further reading 

Sleight, Steve; The New Complete Sailing Manual, Dorling Kindersley Co., (2005) 
Steward, Robert; Boatbuilding Manual, 3rd ed. International Marine Publishing Company. Camden, Maine (1987), p2-3. 

Watercraft components